The Torca River is a river on the Bogotá savanna and a left tributary of the Bogotá River. The Torca wetland is located near its mouth.

Description 

The Torca River originates in the Eastern Hills, in the locality of Usaquén in the north of the Colombian capital. The river enters the urban area of the city near the Bosques de Pinos complex at Carrera 6 with Calle 153. Part of its course is channelised, called El Cedro and Torca channel. The Torca River flows into the Bogotá River near the Torca wetland at the border of Bogotá and Chía. The Autopista Norte crosses the Torca River basin. The river has a high level of contamination.

Wetland 

The  wetland of Torca is located in the Torca River basin. Amphibians registered in Torca are among others the green dotted treefrog (Hyla labialis) and the cream-backed poison frog (Colostethus subpunctatus). In Torca, 24 bird species have been registered, among others the cattle egret (Bubulcus ibis), Bogotá rail (Rallus semiplumbeus), common moorhen (Gallinula chloropus), noble snipe (Gallinago nobilis), solitary sandpiper (Tringa solitaria), grassland yellow finch (Sicalis luteola) and the endemic species to Colombia, yellow-hooded blackbird (Chrysomus icterocephalus). The flora species Carex lanuginosa was a new discovery in the Torca wetland.

See also 

 List of rivers of Colombia
 Eastern Hills, Bogotá
 Bogotá savanna
 Fucha River, Juan Amarillo River, Tunjuelo River

References

Bibliography

Further reading

External links 
  Sistema Hídrico, Bogotá

Rivers of Colombia
Bogotá River
Geography of Cundinamarca Department
Geography of Bogotá
Rivers
Torca